The ninth season of the American animated television series The Simpsons originally aired on the Fox network between September 1997 and May 1998, beginning on Sunday, September 21, 1997, with "The City of New York vs. Homer Simpson". With Mike Scully as showrunner for the ninth production season, the aired season contained three episodes which were hold-over episodes from season eight, which Bill Oakley and Josh Weinstein ran, while the season was produced by Gracie Films and 20th Century Fox Television. It also contained two episodes which were run by David Mirkin, and another two hold-over episodes which were run by Al Jean and Mike Reiss.

Season nine won three Emmy Awards: "Trash of the Titans" for Primetime Emmy Award for Outstanding Animated Program (for Programming Less Than One Hour) in 1998, Hank Azaria won "Outstanding Voice-Over Performance" for the voice of Apu Nahasapeemapetilon, and Alf Clausen and Ken Keeler won the "Outstanding Music and Lyrics" award. Clausen was also nominated for "Outstanding Music Direction" and "Outstanding Music Composition for a Series (Dramatic Underscore)" for "Treehouse of Horror VIII". Season nine was also nominated for a "Best Network Television Series" award by the Saturn Awards and "Best Sound Editing" for a Golden Reel Award.

The Simpsons 9th Season DVD was released on December 19, 2006 in Region 1, January 29, 2007 in Region 2 and March 21, 2007 in Region 4. The DVD was released in two different forms: a Lisa-shaped head, to match the Maggie, Homer and Marge shaped heads from the three previous DVD sets, and also a standard rectangular shaped box. Like the previous DVD sets, both versions are available for sale separately.

Voice cast & characters

 

This is the last season to feature the character Lionel Hutz, voiced by Phil Hartman. Following Hartman's death on May 28, 1998, Hutz was retired along with Hartman's  other recurring character Troy McClure; his final speaking role as Hutz was five months earlier, in the episode "Realty Bites", and has since occasionally appeared as a  background character.

Main cast
 Dan Castellaneta as Homer Simpson, Grampa Simpson, Krusty the Clown, Groundskeeper Willie, Barney Gumble, Santa's Little Helper, and various others
 Julie Kavner as Marge Simpson, Patty Bouvier, Selma Bouvier and various others
 Nancy Cartwright as Bart Simpson, Nelson Muntz, Ralph Wiggum and various others
 Yeardley Smith as Lisa Simpson
 Harry Shearer as Mr. Burns, Waylon Smithers, Ned Flanders, Principal Skinner, Lenny Leonard, Kent Brockman, Reverend Lovejoy, and various others
 Hank Azaria as Moe Szyslak, Chief Wiggum, Professor Frink, Comic Book Guy, Apu, Bumblebee Man and various others

Recurring
 Pamela Hayden as Milhouse van Houten, Jimbo Jones
 Maggie Roswell as Maude Flanders, Helen Lovejoy and Miss Hoover
 Russi Taylor as Martin Prince and Sherri and Terri
 Tress MacNeille as Agnes Skinner
 Marcia Wallace as Edna Krabappel
 Frank Welker as various animals

Guest stars

 Phil Hartman as Troy McClure, Lionel Hutz and Noah (various episodes)
 Martin Sheen as the real Seymour Skinner ("The Principal and the Pauper")
 Fyvush Finkel as himself playing Krusty the Clown ("Lisa's Sax")
 Joe Namath as himself ("Bart Star")
 Roy Firestone as himself ("Bart Star")
 Mike Judge as Hank Hill ("Bart Star")
 Andrea Martin as Apu's mother("The Two Mrs. Nahasapeemapetilons")
 Jan Hooks as Manjula Nahasapeemapetilon ("The Two Mrs. Nahasapeemapetilons")
 Stephen Jay Gould as himself ("Lisa the Skeptic")
 Alex Trebek as himself("Miracle on Evergreen Terrace")
 Jim Varney as Cooder ("Bart Carny")
 James Earl Jones as the narrator ("Das Bus")
Jack Ong as the Chinese fisherman ("Das Bus")
 Jay Leno, Bruce Baum, Janeane Garofalo, Bobcat Goldthwait, Hank Williams Jr. and Steven Wright as themselves ("The Last Temptation of Krust")
 Helen Hunt as Renee ("Dumbbell Indemnity")
 Rod Steiger as Captain Tenille ("Simpson Tide")
 Bob Denver as himself ("Simpson Tide")
 Michael Carrington as Drill Sergeant ("Simpson Tide")
 Paul Winfield as Lucius Sweet ("The Trouble with Trillions")
 Steve Martin as Ray Patterson ("Trash of the Titans")
 U2 as themselves ("Trash of the Titans")
 Paul McGuinness as himself ("Trash of the Titans")
 Brendan Fraser as Brad("King of the Hill")
 Steven Weber as Neil ("King of the Hill")

Reception
The ninth season is considered by some fans and critics to be the end of the Golden Age of The Simpsons. Alasdair Wilkins of The AV Club said: "From here on out, we're in The Simpsons' decline phase, though there's plenty of room to disagree just how stark the drop-off actually was." On Rotten Tomatoes, the ninth season of The Simpsons has a 67% approval rating based on 6 critical  reviews.

The episode "The Principal and the Pauper" received very negative reviews from fans and critics, and is often regarded as one of the most controversial episodes of the entire series. Many fans and critics reacted negatively to the revelation that Principal Skinner, a recurring character since the first season who had undergone much character development, was an impostor. The episode has been criticized by series creator Matt Groening, and by Skinner's voice actor Harry Shearer. In his 2004 book Planet Simpson, Chris Turner describes the episode as the "broadcast that marked [the] abrupt plunge" from The Simpsons' "Golden Age", which he says began in the middle of the show's third season. He calls the episode "[one of] the weakest episodes in Simpsons history", and adds, "A blatant, continuity-scrambling plot twist of this sort might've been forgivable if the result had been as funny or sharply satirical as the classics of the Golden Age, but alas it's emphatically not." Turner notes that the episode "still sports a couple of virtuoso gags", but says that such moments are limited.

In July 2007, in an article in The Guardian, Ian Jones argues that the "show became stupid" in 1997, pointing to the episode as the bellwether. "Come again? A major character in a long-running series gets unmasked as a fraud? It was cheap, idle storytelling", he remarks. In a February 2006 article in The Star-Ledger, Alan Sepinwall and Matt Zoller Seitz cite the episode when asserting that the quality of The Simpsons "gets much spottier" in season nine. Alan Sepinwall observes in another Star-Ledger article, "[The episode] was so implausible that even the characters were disavowing it by the end of the episode." Jon Hein, who coined the term "jumping the shark" to refer to negative changes in television series, writes in Jump the Shark: TV Edition, "We finally spotted a fin at the start of the ninth season when Principal Skinner's true identity was revealed as Armin Tamzarian." James Greene of Nerve.com put the episode fifth on his list "Ten Times The Simpsons Jumped the Shark", calling it a "nonsensical meta-comedy" and arguing that it "seemed to betray the reality of the show itself". On the 25th anniversary of the episode airing, Fatherly looked back negatively at the episode,  described the plot twist as the moment the show stopped being perfect, saying: "It wasn’t funny, it was just mean, and the ending of the episode inadvertently made you complicit in its viciousness. Ultimately, the citizens of Springfield decide to force things back to normal by tying the real Skinner to a departing train and legally declaring that Tamzarian’s theft of an entire life is fine. And, well, yeah we as the viewers wanted things to go back to normal once the episode was over, but…this was just heartless."

Episodes

Nielsen ratings
In terms of households, the show ranked just outside the Top 30, coming in at No. 32 with a 9.3 household rating and a 15 percent audience share. However, in terms of total viewers, the show ranked within the Top 20, coming in at No. 18 for the season, (tying with Dateline Tuesday) and being watched by an average of 15.3 million viewers per episode.

DVD release

The DVD boxset for season nine was released by 20th Century Fox in the United States and Canada on December 19, 2006, eight years after it had completed broadcast on television. As well as every episode from the season, the DVD release features bonus material including deleted scenes, animatics, and commentaries for every episode. As with the two preceding seasons, the set was released in two different packagings: A "Collector's Edition" plastic packaging molded to look like Lisa's head, and a standard rectangular cardboard box featuring Lisa with a backstage pass to a show at a club. The menus continue the same format from the previous four seasons, and the overall theme is various characters waiting in line at a club.

See also

 List of The Simpsons episodes

References
General

 
 

Specific

External links

 Season 9 at The Simpsons.com
 Season 9 at the BBC

Simpsons season 09
1997 American television seasons
1998 American television seasons